Old Mill is a hamlet in the civil parish of Stokeclimsland, Cornwall, England.

References

Hamlets in Cornwall